Airport is an unreleased  Bollywood film directed by Anubhav Sinha and produced by Anubhav Sinha and Anupam Sinha.  It starred Sunny Deol, Sunil Shetty, Arjun Rampal and Bobby Deol.

Cast 
Sunny Deol
Sunil Shetty
Arjun Rampal
Bobby Deol

References

External links
 Airport cast and crew

2000s Hindi-language films
2009 films
Indian aviation films